LY-367642 is a potent and selective serotonin 5-HT1D receptor antagonist which has been used in research to study the function of presynaptic 5-HT1D autoreceptors.

References

5-HT1 antagonists
Fluoroarenes
Indoles
4-Pyridyl compounds
Tetrahydropyridines